Anwarul Momen SBP, OSP, rcds, psc was a two star rank Bangladesh Army officer. His last appointment was Senior Directing Staff (Army-1) at National Defence College.

Career
Maj Gen Momen was commissioned with 12th BMA long course from Bangladesh Military Academy in 1985. Momen previously commanded a composite brigade. He was the Military Secretary to Army Headquarters. He was the GOC of 17th Infantry Division & area commander of Sylhet Area. He commanded a raid on militant den in Sylhet on 25 March 2017 named Operation Twilight.  He was commandant of Bangladesh Military Academy.

References

Living people
Bangladesh Army generals
Year of birth missing (living people)
Graduates of the Royal College of Defence Studies